Gjeving is a village in Tvedestrand municipality in Agder county, Norway. The island village of Lyngør lies just offshore to the south of Gjeving.

References

Villages in Agder
Tvedestrand